Samuel Edward Campbell Chapman (16 February 1938 – 24 July 2019) was a Northern Ireland international footballer and football manager.

Career
A former youth player with Manchester United, Chapman signed for Glentoran upon returning to Northern Ireland. In the summer of 1955, he moved to Crusaders, but by October had signed for Glenavon. In July 1956 Chapman joined Shamrock Rovers.

In October 1956 he moved to Mansfield Town without having played a game for the Hoops. He moved to Portsmouth in February 1958. He re-joined Mansfield Town in December 1961. Having last played professionally in 1963, Chapman was banned from football following a bribes scandal two years later.

The ban signalled the end of Chapman's playing career, although he played a few games for South African club East Rand United. (The ban was ignored by the Apartheid-era South African federation which had been suspended by FIFA.) He eventually returned to the game as a coach with Portsmouth and then Crewe Alexandra. He then served Wolverhampton Wanderers as chief scout, becoming interim manager following the dismissal of Tommy Docherty on 4 July 1985 after a second successive relegation saw Wolves fall into the Third Division. He remained in charge of the first team until Bill McGarry (previously manager of Wolves from 1968 to 1976) returned to manage the club on 4 September 1985. However, McGarry's return as manager lasted just 61 days and he quit on 4 November and Chapman was restored to the manager's seat. However, he was unable to prevent Wolves from suffering a third successive relegation which dragged them into the Fourth Division for the first time in their history. He left on 15 August 1986, just before the start of the 1986-87 season.

Chapman was a member of Northern Ireland's 1958 FIFA World Cup squad (though not one of the 17 players that travelled).

Notes

1938 births
2019 deaths
1958 FIFA World Cup players
Association football midfielders
Association footballers from Northern Ireland
Football managers from Northern Ireland
Glenavon F.C. players
League of Ireland players
Mansfield Town F.C. players
Northern Ireland B international footballers
Northern Ireland amateur international footballers
Portsmouth F.C. players
Shamrock Rovers F.C. players
Association footballers from Belfast
Wolverhampton Wanderers F.C. managers
Sportspeople involved in betting scandals
Sportspeople convicted of crimes
Crusaders F.C. players
Glentoran F.C. players